Alan Cavalcanti better known as Alan (born 21 June 1975) is a Portuguese beach soccer player. He plays in wing and forward positions.

Honours

Beach soccer
 Portugal
FIFA Beach Soccer World Cup winner: 2001, 2015
FIFA Beach Soccer World Cup runner-up: 1999, 2002, 2005
FIFA Beach Soccer World Cup third place: 2003, 2004, 2007, 2008, 2009
FIFA Beach Soccer World Cup fourth place: 2006
Euro Beach Soccer League winner: 2002, 2007, 2008, 2010, 2015
Euro Beach Soccer League runner-up: 2001, 2004, 2005, 2006, 2009, 2016
Euro Beach Soccer League third place: 1999, 2003, 2011
Euro Beach Soccer Cup winner: 1998, 2001, 2002, 2003, 2004, 2006, 2016
Euro Beach Soccer Cup runner-up: 1999, 2010
Euro Beach Soccer Cup third place: 2005, 2007, 2009
FIFA Beach Soccer World Cup qualification (UEFA) runner-up : 2008, 2011
FIFA Beach Soccer World Cup qualification (UEFA) fourth place : 2009
Mundialito winner: 2003, 2008, 2009, 2012, 2014
Mundialito runner-up: 1999, 2000, 2001, 2002, 2005, 2006, 2007, 2010, 2011, 2013, 2016
Mundialito fourth place: 2004
Copa Latina winner: 2000
Copa Latina runner-up: 1998, 1999, 2001, 2002, 2003
Copa Latina third place: 2005

Individual
FIFA Beach Soccer World Cup Top Scorer Golden Shoe (Top Scorer): 2001
Euro Beach Soccer League Top Scorer: 2002
Euro Beach Soccer Cup Fair Play Award: 2006

External links

Portuguese beach soccer players
1975 births
Living people
European Games bronze medalists for Portugal
Beach soccer players at the 2015 European Games
European Games medalists in beach soccer